The Vedas are part of a set of Hindu texts.

Veda or Vedas may refer to:

People
 Veda Ann Borg (1915-1973), American film actress
 Veda Brown, stage name of African-American former gospel and R&B singer Mildred Whitehorn (born 1949)
 Veda Hille (born 1968), Canadian singer-songwriter
 "Veda", nickname of Yoheved Kaplinsky (born 1947), American professor of music
 Veda Krishnamurthy (born 1992), female Indian cricketer
 Veda Beaux Reves, Irish drag artist
 Veda Sastry, Indian 21st-century film actress
 Veda Shook, American flight attendant and union executive
 Veda Wright Stone (1906–1996), American activist who worked on the behalf of Native Americans
 Brandon Vedas (1981-2003), a man who died of drug overdose while using Internet Relay Chat

Arts and entertainment
 Veda (film), a 2010 Turkish film
 Vedera, an indie rock band formerly known as "Veda"
 Veda, a fictional supercomputer in the anime series Mobile Suit Gundam 00

Other uses
 Veda bread, a malted bread from Northern Ireland
 Veda (company), a credit information bureau operating in the Australia/New Zealand region
 Veda (NZ), the largest credit reference agency in New Zealand
 Vedas (horse), a racehorse
 Voluntarios en Defensa de los Animales (Volunteers in Defense of Animals), a nonprofit organization

See also
Vedic (disambiguation)
Vedda (disambiguation)
other Indian texts called "Veda":
Fifth Veda
Dravida Veda
Pranava Veda (disambiguation)